This list of the prehistoric life of Georgia (U.S. state) contains the various prehistoric life-forms whose fossilized remains have been reported from within the US state of Georgia (U.S. state).

Precambrian
The Paleobiology Database records no known occurrences of Precambrian fossils in Alabama.

Paleozoic

Selected Paleozoic taxa of Georgia

  †Alethopteris
 †Alethopteris decurrens
 †Alethopteris lonchitica
 †Alethopteris valida
 †Amplexus
 †Annularia
 †Annularia asteris
 †Annularia radiata
 †Archimedes
 †Archimedes invaginatus
 †Archimedes swallovanus
 †Asaphiscus
 †Atrypa
 †Atrypa reticularis
 †Augustoceras
 †Bonneterrina – tentative report
 †Brooksella alternata
  †Calamites
 †Calamites suckowi
 †Callipteridium
 †Calymene
 †Calymene celebra
 †Calyptaulax
 †Camarotoechia
 †Cincinnetina
 †Cincinnetina meeki
 †Cincinnetina multisecta
 †Columnaria
 †Constellaria
 †Coosella
 †Coosia
 †Cordaites
 †Cryptophragmus
  †Cyrtoceras
 †Dalmanitina
 †Dipleura
 †Elrathia
 †Elrathina – tentative report
 †Eospirifer
 †Eospirifer radiatus
 †Favosites
 †Favosites turbinatus
 †Flexicalymene
 †Gonioceras
 †Hallopora
 †Isotelus
  †Lepidodendron
 †Lepidodendron aculeatum
 †Lepidodendron obovatum
 †Lingula
 †Lithostrotion
 †Lyginopteris
 †Michelinoceras
 †Murchisonia
  †Neuropteris
 †Neuropteris flexuosa
 †Neuropteris heterophylla – or unidentified comparable form
 †Orthoceras
 †Pecopteris
 †Pecopteris elliptica – tentative report
 †Pelagiella
 †Pentamerus
 †Pentremites
 †Peronopsis
 †Phacops
 †Phragmolites
 †Platycrinites
 †Platystrophia
 †Platystrophia acutilirata
  †Pleurodictyum
 †Sigillaria
 †Sigillaria elegans
 †Solenopora
 †Solenopora compacta
 †Sowerbyella
 †Sphenophyllum
 †Sphenophyllum cuneifolium
 †Sphenopteris
 †Sphenopteris elegans – or unidentified comparable form
 †Sphenopteris pottsvillea
 †Spirifer
 †Spirifer grimesi
 †Stigmaria
 †Strophomena
 †Strophomena incurvata
 †Strophomena planumbona
 †Subulites
 †Tetradium
  †Tricrepicephalus
 †Valcouroceras

Mesozoic

Selected Mesozoic taxa of Georgia

 Acirsa
 Acteon
 †Acteonella
 †Aenona
  †Agerostrea
 †Albertosaurus
 †Allonia – type locality for genus
 Amauropsis
 †Ancilla
 †Anomia
 †Anomoeodus
 †Arca
 Arrhoges
 Astarte
  †Baculites
 †Bedellia – type locality for genus
 Botula
 †Botula conchafodentis
 †Botula ripleyana
 Brachidontes
 Cadulus
 Caestocorbula
 †Caestocorbula crassaplica
 †Caestocorbula crassiplica
 †Caestocorbula percompressa
 †Caestocorbula suffalciata
 †Caestocorbula terramaria
 †Calliomphalus
 †Calliomphalus americanus
 †Calliomphalus nudus
 †Caveola
 Cerithiella
 †Cerithiella nodoliratum – or unidentified related form
  Chiloscyllium
 Chiton
 Chlamys
 Cliona
  Corbula
 Crassostrea
 †Crenella
 †Crenella elegantula
 †Crenella serica
  †Cretolamna
 †Cretolamna appendiculata
 Cucullaea
 †Cucullaea capax
 †Cucullaea littlei
 Cuspidaria
 †Cuspidaria grandis
 Cylichna
 †Cylichna diversilirata
 †Cylichna incisa
  †Deinosuchus
 †Deinosuchus rugosus
 Dentalium
 †Dentalium leve
 †Dolicholatirus
  †Enchodus
 †Enchodus petrosus
 †Eulima
 †Eulima gracilistylis
 †Eulima monmouthensis
 †Euspira
  †Eutrephoceras
  †Exogyra
 †Exogyra costata
 †Exogyra ponderosa
 †Exogyra upatoiensis
 Gemmula
 Ginglymostoma
 Glossus
 Glycymeris
 †Glycymeris hamula
 †Glycymeris rotundata
  †Halisaurus
 †Hamulus
 Heterodontus
  †Hybodus
 †Ischyrhiza
 †Ischyrhiza mira
 Isognomon
 Lepisosteus
 Lima
 Limatula
 †Linearis
 †Linter
 †Lissodus
 Lithophaga
 Lopha
 †Lopha falcata
 †Lopha mesenterica
 †Mathilda
  †Megalocoelacanthus
 †Megalocoelacanthus dobiei
 †Modiolus
 †Modiolus sedesclaris
 †Modiolus sedesclarus
 †Morea
 Nerita
 Nozeba
  Nucula
 †Nucula camia
 †Nucula cuneifrons
 †Nucula percrassa
 †Nucula severnensis
  Ostrea
 Panopea
 †Paralbula
 † Paranomia
 Pholadomya
 †Pinna
 †Placenticeras
 †Placenticeras benningi
  †Platecarpus
 Polinices
  †Prognathodon
 †Protocardia
 †Pseudocorax
 †Pseudocorax affinis
 †Pteria
 †Pteridophyte
 †Pterotrigonia
 †Pterotrigonia angulicostata
 †Pterotrigonia cerulea
 †Pterotrigonia eufalensis
 †Pterotrigonia eufaulensis
  †Ptychodus
 †Ptychodus mortoni
 †Ptychotrygon
 †Ptychotrygon triangularis – or unidentified comparable form
 Pycnodonte
 †Pycnodonte vesicularis
 †Regnellidium
 †Rhombodus
 Ringicula
 †Ringicula clarki
 Rissoa
 †Scapanorhynchus
 †Scapanorhynchus rhaphiodon
 †Scapanorhynchus texanus
 Seila
 Serpula
  †Sphenodiscus
  Squalicorax
 †Squalicorax falcatus
 †Squalicorax kaupi
 Squatina
 †Stephanodus
 Teinostoma
 Tellina
 †Tenea
  †Thoracosaurus
 Trachycardium
 †Trachycardium eufaulensis
 Turritella
 †Turritella bilira
 †Turritella hilgardi
 †Turritella trilira
 †Turritella vertebroides
 Xenophora
  †Xiphactinus
 †Xiphactinus audax

Cenozoic

Selected Cenozoic taxa of Georgia

 Abra
 Acanthocardia
 Acar
  Acteocina
 Aequipecten
 Aetobatus
 †Aetobatus narinari
 Agassizia
 Agkistrodon
 †Agkistrodon piscivorus
 Aix
 †Aix sponsa
 Alligator
  †Alligator mississippiensis
 Alosa – or unidentified comparable form
 Alveopora
 Amauropsis
 †Ambystoma
 †Ambystoma maculatum – or unidentified comparable form
 †Ambystoma tigrinum
 Amnicola
  Amphiuma
 †Ampullina
 †Ampullinopsis
 Amusium
 Anadara
  †Anadara brasiliana
 †Anadara ovalis
 †Anadara transversa
 Anas
 †Anas acuta
 †Anas americana
 †Anas crecca
 †Anas discors
 †Anas platyrhynchos – or unidentified comparable form
 †Anas rubripes
 †Anas strepera
 Anolis
  †Anolis carolinensis
 Anomia
 †Anomia simplex
 Apalone
  †Apalone ferox
 Arca
 Architectonica
 †Archosargus
  †Archosargus probatocephalus
 Arius
 Asio
 Astarte – report made of unidentified related form or using admittedly obsolete nomenclature
  Astrangia
 †Astrangia danae
 Astreopora
 Athleta – or unidentified comparable form
 Atrina
 Aythya
 †Aythya collaris
 Bairdiella
 †Bairdiella chrysoura – or unidentified comparable form
 Balistes
 Barbatia
 Bartramia
 †Bartramia longicauda
  †Basilosaurus
 †Basilosaurus cetoides
 Bison
  †Bison bison – tentative report
 Bittium
 Blarina
 †Blarina brevicauda
 †Blarina carolinensis
 Bonasa
 †Bonasa umbellus
 †Braarudosphaera bigelowii
 Bucephala
  †Bucephala albeola
 Bufo
 †Bufo americanus
 †Burnhamia
 Bursa
 Busycon
 †Busycon carica
 †Calippus
 Callista
 Calyptraea
 †Calyptraea centralis
 Campanile
 Canis
  †Canis lupus – or unidentified comparable form
 Carcharhinus
 †Carcharhinus leucas
 †Carcharhinus macloti – or unidentified comparable form
 †Carcharhinus obscurus
 Carcharias
 †Carcharias taurus
  Carcharodon
 Cardita
 Carditamera
 Carphophis
 †Carphophis amoenus
 Carya
 Cassis
 Castor
 †Castor canadensis
  †Castoroides
 †Castoroides ohioensis
 Catoptrophorus – or unidentified comparable form
 †Catoptrophorus semipalmatus
 Cerithiopsis
  Cerithium
 †Cerithium georgianum
 Cervus
  †Cervus elaphus
 Chama
 Chelydra
 †Chelydra serpentina
 Chlamys
 Chlorostoma
 Clypeaster
  Coccolithus
 Colaptes
 †Colaptes auratus
 Colinus
 †Colinus virginianus
 Coluber
 †Coluber constrictor
 Conepatus
 †Conepatus leuconotus
 Conomitra
 Conus
 Coragyps
 †Coragyps atratus
 Corbula
 Corvus
 †Corvus brachyrhynchos
  †Corvus corax
 Crassostrea
 †Crassostrea virginica
 Crepidula
 †Crepidula fornicata
 Crocodylus
 Crotalus
  †Crotalus horridus
 Crucibulum
 Cucullaea
 Cyanocitta
 †Cyanocitta cristata
 Cygnus
 †Cygnus columbianus
 †Cylindracanthus
 Cymatium
  †Cynthiacetus
 Cypraea
 Dasyatis
 Dasypus
 †Dasypus bellus
 Deirochelys
 †Deirochelys reticularia
 Dentalium
 Diadophis
 †Diadophis punctatus
 Diastoma
 Didelphis
  †Didelphis marsupialis
 †Didelphis virginiana
 Diodora
 Diploastrea
 †Discoaster
 Donax
 †Donax variabilis
  †Dorudon
 †Dorudon serratus
 Dosinia
 Dryocopus
 †Dryocopus pileatus
 †Ectopistes
 †Ectopistes migratorius
 Edaphodon
 Elops
 †Elops saurus
 Epitonium
 Eptesicus
 †Eptesicus fuscus – or unidentified comparable form
 Equus
  †Equus simplicidens
  †Eremotherium
 †Eremotherium laurillardi
 Eschrichtius
 †Eschrichtius robustus
 †Eucastor
 Eupleura
 †Eupleura caudata
 Falco
 †Falco sparverius
 Favites
 Felis
 †Fundulus
 Fusinus
 Galeocerdo
  †Galeocerdo cuvier
 Galeorhinus
 †Galeorhinus galeus
 Gari
 Gastrochaena
 Gemma
 †Gemma purpurea
  †Georgiacetus – type locality for genus
 †Georgiacetus vogtlensis – type locality for species
 Ginglymostoma
 †Ginglymostoma cirratum
 Glycymeris
 Glyptemys
 †Glyptemys insculpta
 Goniopora
 Gopherus
 †Gopherus polyphemus
 Haustator
  Hemipristis
 †Hemipristis curvatus
 Hesperisternia
 †Hesperotestudo
 Heterodon
 †Heterodon platyrhinos
 Heterodontus
 Hexaplex
 †Hexaplex fulvescens
  †Hippotherium
  †Holmesina
 Hyla
 †Hyla crucifer
 Isurus
 †Isurus oxyrinchus
 Kinosternon
 †Lactophrys
 Laevicardium
 †Lagodon
 †Lagodon rhomboides
 Lamna
 Lampropeltis
 †Lampropeltis getulus
 †Lampropeltis triangulum
  Leopardus
  Lepisosteus
 †Leptotragulus
 Lima
 †Linthia
 Liotia
 Liquidambar
 Lithophaga
 Littoraria
 †Littoraria irrorata
 Lontra
 †Lontra canadensis
 Lopha
 Lophelia
 Lophodytes
  †Lophodytes cucullatus
 Lucina
 Lynx
  †Lynx rufus
 Lyria
 Macrocallista
 Mactra
 Malaclemys
 †Malaclemys terrapin
 †Mammut
  †Mammut americanum
 †Mammuthus
  †Mammuthus columbi
 Margarites
 Marginella
 Marmota
 †Marmota monax
 †Megalonyx
  †Megatherium
 †Megatherium americanum
 Melanerpes
 Meleagris
  †Meleagris gallopavo
 Melongena
 †Melongena corona
 Mephitis
  †Mephitis mephitis
 Mercenaria
 †Mercenaria mercenaria
 Meretrix
 Mesalia
 Microtus
 †Microtus pennsylvanicus
 †Microtus pinetorum
  †Miracinonyx
 †Miracinonyx inexpectatus – or unidentified comparable form
 Mitra
 Modiolus
 †Monosaulax – or unidentified comparable form
 Mugil
 Mulinia
 †Mulinia lateralis
 Mustela
 †Mustela frenata – or unidentified comparable form
 Myliobatis
  †Mylohyus
 †Mylohyus fossilis
 Myotis
 †Myotis grisescens – or unidentified comparable form
 †Myotis lucifugus – or unidentified comparable form
  Nassarius
 †Nassarius acutus
 Natica
 Nebrius
 Negaprion
  †Negaprion brevirostris
 †Negaprion eurybathrodon
 †Neochoerus
 †Neochoerus aesopi
 †Neochoerus pinckneyi – or unidentified comparable form
 Neofiber
 †Neofiber alleni
 Neomonachus
  †Neomonachus tropicalis
 Neotoma
 †Neotoma floridana
 Nerita
 Neritina
 Nerodia
 †Nerodia fasciata
 †Nerodia sipedon
 Neverita
 Notophthalmus
 †Notophthalmus viridescens
 Nucula
 †Nucula proxima
 Nummulites
 Odocoileus
 †Odocoileus virginianus
  Odontaspis
 Oliva
 †Oliva sayana
 Ondatra
 †Ondatra zibethicus
 †Ontocetus
 †Ontocetus emmonsi
 †Opsanus
 Oryzomys
 †Oryzomys palustris
 Ostrea
  †Otodus
 Otus
 †Otus asio
 †Palaeolama
  †Palaeophis
 Panopea
 Panthera
 †Panthera onca
  †Paramylodon
 †Paramylodon harlani
 Pecten
 Pekania
 †Pekania pennanti
 Periglypta
 Peromyscus
 †Peromyscus leucopus – or unidentified comparable form
 †Peromyscus maniculatus – or unidentified comparable form
 †Peromyscus polionotus – or unidentified comparable form
 Persicula
 Persististrombus
 Petricola
 †Petricola pholadiformis
 Phyllodus
  Physeter
 †Physeterula
 †Physogaleus
 Pica
 †Pica pica
 Picoides
 †Picoides villosus
 Pipistrellus
 †Pipistrellus subflavus – or unidentified comparable form
  Pitar
 Pituophis
 Placopecten
 †Placopecten magellanicus
 Planorbis
  †Platygonus
 †Platygonus compressus – or unidentified comparable form
 Plethodon
 †Plethodon glutinosus – or unidentified comparable form
 Pleuromeris
 †Pleuromeris tridentata
 Plicatula
 Podilymbus
 †Podilymbus podiceps
 Pogonias
 †Pogonias cromis
 †Potamides
 Prionotus
  Pristis
 Procyon
 †Procyon lotor
 Pseudacris
 †Pseudacris ornata
 Pseudemys
 †Pseudemys concinna – or unidentified comparable form
  †Pseudhipparion
 Pseudotriton
 †Pseudotriton ruber
 Pteria – report made of unidentified related form or using admittedly obsolete nomenclature
 Pterynotus
 Puma
 †Puma concolor
 Quercus
 Raja
 †Raja
 †Rana
  †Rana catesbeiana
 †Rana pipiens
 Rangia
 Rangifer
  †Rangifer tarandus
 Rapana
 †Regina
 Rhinobatos
 Rhinoptera
 Rhizoprionodon
 †Rhizoprionodon terraenovae
 Sayornis
 †Sayornis phoebe
 Scalopus
 †Scalopus aquaticus
 Sceloporus
  †Sceloporus undulatus
 Schizaster
 Schizoporella
 Sciurus
 †Sciurus carolinensis
 †Scoliodon
 Scolopax
 †Scolopax minor
  Scyliorhinus
 Semele – tentative report
 Siderastrea
 Sigmodon
 †Sigmodon hispidus
 Sinum
 Siren
 †Siren intermedia – or unidentified comparable form
 Solemya
 Sorex
 †Sorex cinereus
 †Sorex fumeus
 Sphyraena
 Sphyrna
  †Sphyrna tiburo
 †Sphyrna zygaena
 Spilogale
 †Spilogale putorius
 Spisula
 Spizella
 †Spizella passerina
 Spondylus
 Squatina
  Sternotherus
  †Striatolamia
 Strioterebrum
 Strombus
 Stylophora
 Sylvilagus
 †Sylvilagus floridanus
 †Sylvilagus palustris
 †Sylvilagus transitionalis
 Synaptomys
 †Synaptomys cooperi
  Synodus
 Tamias – type locality for genus
 †Tamias aristus – type locality for species
  Tapirus
 †Tapirus veroensis
 Taxodium
 Teinostoma
  †Teleoceras
 Tellina
 Teredo
 Terrapene
 †Terrapene carolina
 Thamnophis
 †Thamnophis sirtalis
 Trachemys
 †Trachemys scripta
 Trachycardium
 Trachyphyllia – tentative report
  Tremarctos
 †Tremarctos floridanus
 †Triaenodon
 Trichiurus
 Trochita
 Turris
 Turritella
 Tympanuchus
  †Tympanuchus cupido
 Ulmus
 Urocyon
 †Urocyon cinereoargenteus
 Ursus
 †Ursus americanus
 Venericardia
 Xenophora
 †Xenophora conchyliophora
 Yoldia
 Zapus
  †Zapus hudsonius

References
 

Georgia